Mattias is a masculine given name found most prominently in Northern Europe. It is a cognate of Matthew and Matthias, and may refer to:

Sports 

 Mattias Adelstam (born 1982), Swedish footballer
 Mattias Asper (born 1974), Swedish goalkeeper
 Mattias Bäckman (born 1992), Swedish ice hockey defenceman
 Mattias Beck (born 1983), Swedish ice hockey player
 Mattias Bjärsmyr (born 1986), Swedish footballer
 Mattias Blomberg (born 1976), Swedish snowboarder 
 Mattias Borg (born 1991), Swedish badminton player
 Mattias Carlsson (born 1980), Swedish ice hockey winger
 Mattias Claesson (born 1986), Swedish middle-distance runner
 Mattias Ekholm (born 1990), Swedish ice hockey defenceman
 Mattias Ekström (born 1978), Swedish racing driver 
 Mattias Elfström (born 1997), Swedish ice hockey player
 Mattias Eliasson (born 1975), Swedish professional golfer
 Mattias Eriksson (born 1981), Swedish archer
 Mattias Falck (born 1991), Swedish table tennis player
 Mattias Gestranius (born 1978), Finnish laboratory technician
 Mattias Granlund (born 1992), Swedish ice hockey player
 Mattias Gustafsson (born 1978), Swedish handball player
 Mattias Guter (born 1988), Swedish ice hockey player
 Mattias Håkansson (born 1993), Swedish footballer
 Mattias Thunman Hälldahl (born 1993), Swedish ice hockey defenceman
 Mattias Hargin (born 1985), Swedish alpine ski racer
 Mattias Hellstrom (born 1978), Swedish tennis player
 Mattias Hubrich (born 1966), New Zealand alpine skier
 Mattias Hugosson (born 1974), Swedish footballer
 Mattias Janmark-Nylén (born 1992), Swedish ice hockey center
 Mattias Johansson (born 1992), Swedish footballer
 Mattias Jons (born 1982), Swedish hammer thrower
 Mattias Jonson (born 1974), Swedish former football player
 Mattias Käit (born 1998), Estonian footballer 
 Mattias Mete (born 1987), Swedish footballer
 Mattias Modig (born 1987), Swedish ice hockey goaltender
 Mattias Moström (born 1983), Swedish footballer
 Mattias Neuenschwander (born 1953), Swiss curler
 Mattias Nilsson (born 1982), Swedish biathlete
 Mattias Nilsson (ice hockey) (born 1994), Swedish ice hockey defenceman
 Mattias Nørstebø (born 1995), Norwegian ice hockey defenceman
 Mattias Norström (born 1972), Swedish ice hockey player
 Mattias Nylund (born 1980), Swedish soccer player
 Mattias Ohlin (born 1978), Swedish freestyle swimmer
 Mattias Öhlund (born 1976), Swedish ice hockey defenceman
 Mattias Oscarsson (born 1975), Swedish canoeist 
 Mattias Östberg (born 1977), Swedish footballer
 Mattias Persson (born 1985), Swedish ice hockey player
 Mattias Rahm (born 1973), Swedish sailor 
 Mattias Remstam (born 1975), Swedish ice hockey player
 Mattias Ritola (born 1987), Swedish ice hockey player
 Mattias Rydberg (born 1985), Swedish bandy player
 Mattias Saari (born 1994), Swedish ice hockey player
 Mattias Samuelsson (born 2000), American ice hockey defenseman
 Mattias Schnorf (born 1984), Swiss footballer
 Mattias Schoberg (born 1973), Swedish wrestler
 Mattias Sereinig (born 1984), Austrian midfielder
 Mattias Siimar (born 1998), Estonian tennis player
 Mattias Sjögren (born 1987), Swedish ice hockey centre
 Mattias Sunneborn (born 1970), Swedish Olympic athlete
 Mattias Svanberg (born 1999), Swedish footballer
 Mattias Tedenby (born 1990), Swedish ice hockey player
 Mattias Thylander (born 1974), Swedish former football player
 Mattias Tichy (born 1974), Swedish rower
 Mattias Timander (born 1974), Swedish ice hockey player
 Mattias Vegnaduzzo (born 1983), Argentine footballer
 Mattias Weinhandl (born 1980), Swedish ice hockey player
 Mattias Wennerberg (born 1981), Swedish ice hockey player
 Mattias Wigardt (born 1986), Swedish badminton player
 Mattias Wiklöf (born 1979), Swedish footballer
 Mattias Zachrisson (born 1990), Swedish handball player

Other fields 

 Mattias Agabus (born 1977), Estonian architect
 Mattias Alkberg (born 1969), Swedish poet
 Mattias Andréasson (born 1981), Swedish singer
 Mattias Bärjed (born 1973), Swedish musician
 Mattias Eklundh (born 1969), Swedish guitarist
 Mattias Flink (born 1970), Swedish mass murderer
 Mattias Gardell (born 1959), Swedish historian
 Mattias Härenstam (born 1971), Swedish artist
 Mattias Hellberg (born 1973), Swedish musician
 Mattias Bäckström Johansson (born 1985), Swedish politician
 Mattias Jonsson (born 1974), Swedish politician
 Mattias Jorstedt, Swedish Magic: The Gathering player
 Mattias Klum (born 1968), Swedish freelance photographer
 Mattias Kumm (born 1967), German professor
 Mattias Lindblom (born 1971), Swedish singer
 Mattias Mainiero (born 1955), Italian journalist
 Mattias Marklund (born 1974), Swedish guitarist
 Mattias de' Medici (1613–1667), Italian governor
 Mattias Morheden (born 1970), Swedish film editor
 Mattias Olsson (born 1975), Chinese record producer
 Mattias Schulstad (born 1984), Swedish guitarist
 Mattias Ståhl (born 1971), Swedish composer
 Mattias Svensson (born 1972), Swedish writer
 Mattias Tesfaye (born 1981), Danish politician
 Mattias Therman (born 1974), Finnish businessman

See also
 Matthias
 Mathias (disambiguation)
 Matias

Danish masculine given names
Estonian masculine given names
Finnish masculine given names
Swedish masculine given names